Son by Four is a latin music group from Puerto Rico, well known for their English U.S. pop hit "The Purest of Pain (A Puro Dolor)". The group is now independent, as they founded their own label SB4 Music Group in 2003.

Son by Four was created by Panamanian producer and songwriter Omar Alfanno and their members Ángel López, Pedro Quiles, and brothers Javier Montes and Jorge Montes. Currently, the band is formed by the Montes brothers, Javi and Jorge.

Music career
In 1998, the group released two songs produced by Omar Alfanno, "No Hay Razón" and "Nada". The songs were minor hits on the Billboard Latin Tracks chart, and helped Son by Four sign a recording contract with Sony Music. The same year, they had their first album Prepárense and started touring to promote the album. In early 2000, they released an eponymous album featuring single "A Puro Dolor". This song, written by Omar Alfanno and originally recorded in Spanish, proved to be a success. Its ballad version was featured in the Mexican soap opera La Calle de las Novias, and Venezuelan soap opera Mis Tres Hermanas. The single spent a year on the Billboard Latin singles chart and set a record for staying at number one for 20 weeks. It also got a place in the Billboards tropical music charts for 21 weeks. "A Puro Dolor" ranks at number one in Billboards Decade-End Latin Songs of 2000s chart.

The English version of the song ("Purest of Pain") placed at number 26 on Billboards pop music charts. The album sold 315,000 units in the United States, and more than one million copies worldwide. "A Puro Dolor" subsequently helped Son by Four earn gold sales status, as well as receiving four prizes at Billboard Music Awards (December 2000) and seven prizes the Billboard Latin Music Awards (April 2001), including Hot Latin Track Artist of the Year. The Spanish version of the song appeared at number 65 in Billboard Hot 100 Singles chart, which was conceived as a rare feat for a Spanish single. The group soon recorded a new English-language version, named "The Purest of Pain", and this version got into the top 30, peaking at number 26. Son by Four continued to release two albums Salsa Hits in 2001 and Renace in 2003, but these were less successful than their second album.

2007–present: Catholic music
From 2007, the band conformed only by Pedro Quiles and the brothers Javier and George Montes has changed their music style from Latin pop, salsa and ballad to Catholic music.

Discography

Studio albums
1998: Prepárense
2000: Son by Four
2000: Purest of Pain
2003: Renace
2007: Aquí Está el Cordero
2008: Música y Palabra Vol. 1
2009: Abbanuestro
2010: Madre Mía
2011: Católico Soy
2015: Mujer Frente a la Cruz (Latín Grammy Nominee for Best Christian Álbum)
2020: Tu Voluntad(single)
2021: Reina Inmaculada(single)
2021: Dios Con Nosotros(single)
2022: No Dejaste De Amarme[Estación Cero and Son By Four] (single)
2022: Lo que has comenzado(single)
2022: XV(catholic hits)

Other albums
2001: Salsa Hits
2001: Vida Mía [Son By Four and Jaci Velazquez] (single)
2002: The Remixes

Footnotes

https://www.aciprensa.com/noticias/son-by-four-cumple-15-anos-haciendo-musica-catolica-94446

References

Video Oficial de "Lo Que Has Comenzado" invitado especial, el actor colombiano Andrés Sandoval, co-protaginista de la serie de Netflix "La Reina del Flow" https://www.youtube.com/watch?time_continue=87&v=PMDboH1PW1c

External links

Puerto Rican musical groups
Salsa music groups
Musical groups established in 1997
American Christian musical groups
Sony Discos artists
Latin pop music groups
Catholic musical groups